Bare-knuckle means without gloves, bandages or any other protection for and/or dangerous 'arming' (such as a knuckle-duster) of the knuckles, a larger part or even the whole hand.  It refers specifically to:

 Bare-knuckle boxing, boxing without boxing gloves
 Bare Knuckles, a 1977 American blaxploitation film directed by Don Edmonds
 Bare Knuckles (1921 film), a 1921 American drama film directed by James P. Hogan
 Bare Knuckle, the original Japanese name for the Streets of Rage series of video games
 Fighting in ice hockey, in ice hockey rule books, fighting is referred to as "fisticuffs" as they fight without gloves, and is therefore "bare-knuckle"
 Vale tudo, a name for a form of no rules fighting from Brazil
 Bare Knuckle Pickups, a business that produces hand-wound guitar pickups in the United Kingdom